Antaqucha (Quechua anta copper, qucha lake, "copper lake", Hispanicized spelling Antaccocha) is a lake in Peru. It is situated in the Apurímac Region, Andahuaylas Province, San Jerónimo District, southwest of the mountain Puka Wanaku (Quechua for "red guanaco", Hispanicized Pucahuanaco).

See also
List of lakes in Peru

References

Lakes of Peru
Lakes of Apurímac Region